The minister of Seniors, previously known as the minister of State for Seniors, is a Minister of the Crown in the Canadian Cabinet. The portfolio was initially introduced during the government of Stephen Harper but the position was labeled as a Minister of State. The portfolio was reintroduced during the government of Justin Trudeau, in July 2018. The current officeholder is Kamal Khera, appointed on October 26, 2021.

List of ministers 
Key:

References

Canadian ministers